is a passenger railway station located in Chūō-ku, Chiba, Chiba Prefecture, Japan, operated by East Japan Railway Company (JR East).

Lines
Higashi-Chiba Station is served by the Sōbu Main Line, and is located 40.1 km from the western terminus of the line at Tokyo Station.

Station layout
The station consists of one island platform with an elevated station building located above the platform and tracks.The station is staffed.

Platforms

History
Higashi-Chiba Station was opened on December 20, 1965 on the location of a former switchback located near the Chiba City Public Assembly Hall. The station was absorbed into the JR East network upon the privatization of the Japan National Railways (JNR) on April 1, 1987.

Passenger statistics
In fiscal 2019, the station was used by an average of 2,646 passengers daily (boarding passengers only).

Surrounding area
Chiba Civic Hall
Sakaemachi Street
Chiba Park

See also
 List of railway stations in Japan

References

External links

  JR East station information 

Railway stations in Chiba Prefecture
Railway stations in Japan opened in 1965
Railway stations in Chiba (city)
Sōbu Main Line